Mineral Point is a city in Iowa County, Wisconsin, United States. The population was 2,581 at the 2020 census. The city is located within the Town of Mineral Point. Mineral Point is part of the Madison Metropolitan Statistical Area. 

Mineral Point was settled in 1827, becoming a lead and zinc mining center, and commercial town in the 19th and early 20th centuries. In the mid-20th century it attracted artists and an artist's colony and its tourism industry began to grow. The city's well-preserved historical character within the varied natural topography of the driftless area has made it a regional tourist destination. Mineral Point is sometimes called Wisconsin's third oldest city, but the Wisconsin Historical Society notes several older colonial settlements.

History 
The first European settlement at Mineral Point began in 1827. One of the first settlers to the area was Henry Dodge and his family who settled a few miles away from Mineral Point. During the following year, large quantities of galena, or lead ore, were discovered around the settlement in shallow deposits. Lead had many uses at the time, and settlers began to flock to the region hoping to make a living by extracting the easily accessible mineral. Lead deposits extended throughout an area that also included Dubuque, Iowa and Galena, Illinois, but Mineral Point became the center of lead mining operations within the bounds of present-day Wisconsin (then part of Michigan Territory). By 1829, the region's growing population led to the creation of Iowa County, which included all of the lead mining lands within the territory. Mineral Point was established as the county seat later that year. During the Black Hawk War of 1832, residents of Mineral Point built Fort Jackson to protect the town from a possible attack. The young settlement's importance was further confirmed in 1834 when it was selected as the site of one of two federal land offices responsible for distributing public land to settlers within the area that now encompasses Wisconsin.

When Wisconsin Territory was created in 1836, Mineral Point hosted the inauguration of the first territorial governor, Henry Dodge, and the territorial secretary, John S. Horner. During the ceremony, a design by Horner was officially recognized as the Great Seal of Wisconsin Territory. It displayed an arm holding a pickaxe over a pile of lead ore, demonstrating the importance of Mineral Point's early mining economy to the new territory. A census conducted in the months after the inauguration showed that Iowa County had  5,234 inhabitants, making it the most populous county in the Wisconsin Territory east of the Mississippi River.

Mineral Point remained an important lead mining center during the 1840s. Although the most easily accessible lead deposits on the surface were being exhausted by this time, new immigrants began to arrive with more refined techniques for extracting ore. The largest group came from Cornwall, which had been a mining center for centuries. Experienced Cornish miners were attracted to the lead mining opportunities in Mineral Point, and by 1845 roughly half of the town's population had Cornish ancestry. The original dwellings of some of these early Cornish immigrants have been restored at the Pendarvis Historic Site in Mineral Point. Lead continued to be produced in abundant quantities by the Cornish miners, and in 1847, the Mineral Point Tribune reported that the town's furnaces were producing 43,800 pounds (19,900 kg) of lead each day.

Mining activity in Mineral Point began to decline in the following years. In 1848, the same year that Wisconsin achieved statehood, gold was discovered in California. Many experienced miners left Mineral Point to look for gold, and in all, the town lost 700 people during the California Gold Rush. While the lead industry in Mineral Point continued into the 1860s, the town never recovered its former importance. A further blow was struck in 1861 when the county seat of Iowa County was relocated to nearby Dodgeville, Wisconsin, where it remains today. Afterwards there was an intense rivalry between the two cities, during which Mineral Point fired a cannon towards Dodgeville's direction.

As lead mining declined in Mineral Point, zinc mining and smelting became important new industries. Zinc ore was discovered with increasing frequency near the bottoms of old lead mines. The Mineral Point Zinc Company was founded in 1882, and by 1891 it was operating the largest zinc oxide works in the United States at Mineral Point. Zinc mining and processing continued on a large scale until the 1920s.

In 1897 Robert M. La Follette gave his "The danger threatening representative government" speech in Mineral Point.

In the 1930s, a local resident, Robert Neal, together with his partner, Edgar Hellum, aimed to preserve some of the history of the Cornish miners' and settlers' stone structures.  Over the next decades, they bought and restored buildings, and turned one into a popular Cornish restaurant attracting tourists.  They had both studied art, and they also attracted other artists to move to the area.  These buildings are now the Pendarvis Historic Site.

Geography
 
Mineral Point lies within the Driftless Area.

Demographics

2020 census
As of the census of 2020, the population was 2,581. The racial makeup of the city was 95.4% White, 0.5% Asian, 0.5% Black or African American, 0.5% from other races, and 3.1% from two or more races. Ethnically, the population was 1.8% Hispanic or Latino of any race.

2010 census
As of the census of 2010, there were 2,487 people, 1,147 households, and 648 families residing in the city. The racial makeup of the city was 97.9% White, 0.6% African American, 0.1% Native American, 0.8% Asian, 0.1% from other races, and 0.5% from two or more races. Hispanic or Latino of any race were 0.7% of the population.

There were 1,147 households, of which 26.9% had children under the age of 18 living with them, 44.6% were married couples living together, 8.1% had a female householder with no husband present, 3.7% had a male householder with no wife present, and 43.5% were non-families. 37.3% of all households were made up of individuals, and 16.6% had someone living alone who was 65 years of age or older. The average household size was 2.14 and the average family size was 2.83.

The median age in the city was 43.7 years. 21.3% of residents were under the age of 18; 6.8% were between the ages of 18 and 24; 23.5% were from 25 to 44; 30.3% were from 45 to 64; and 18.2% were 65 years of age or older. The gender makeup of the city was 48.0% male and 52.0% female.

Media
 The Democrat Tribune, a weekly community newspaper founded in 1849.

Transportation
 Iowa County Airport (KMRJ) serves the city, county and surrounding communities.

Cuisine 

Mineral Point restaurants are known for serving Cornish food, such as pasties and figgyhobbin.

Recreation
The city is home to an endpoint of the Cheese Country Trail.

Sister city 
 Mineral Point is a sister city of Redruth in Cornwall, UK.

Historical buildings

Much of the city is a historical district, including blocks of stone cottages and businesses crafted by the Cornish settlers in the 1800s. A more recent building is the City Hall, built in 1914, which includes the library and the Opera House. The Opera House underwent a $2 million renovation in 2010.

Pendarvis, a state historical site, is a historically accurate preservation of some of the original cottages. It is open for tours in the summer months. Shake Rag Alley contains seven historic structures; an outdoor summer theatre, Alley Stage; and a community-owned center for the arts, which sponsors a children's art program and adult classes.

 Cothern House, home of Montgomery Cothern
 Fort Defiance, was located along Highway 23 near the present Iowa and Lafayette County border in 1832 during the Black Hawk War.  A memorial marker commemorates the location. 
 Fort Jackson
 Jerusalem Springs was the first location of religious services in Mineral Point in the 1820s 
 Walker House
 Orchard Lawn - home of the Mineral Point Historical Society
 Mineral Point and Northern Railroad Depot (later the Milwaukee Road Depot) 
 Mineral Point Opera House
 Shake Rag Alley Center for the Arts
 Stronghold, home of Moses M. Strong, first President of the Wisconsin Bar Association
 Trinity Episcopal Church built in 1845

Notable people

 John Catlin, Acting Governor of the Wisconsin Territory
 Samuel Crawford, Wisconsin Supreme Court
 Amasa Cobb, U.S. Representative
 Montgomery Morrison Cothren, Wisconsin legislator and jurist
 George G. Cox, Wisconsin legislator
 Lee Croft, NFL player
 Bill Dyke, former U.S. vice presidential candidate
 Jack Enzenroth, MLB player
 Ansley Gray, Wisconsin State Representative
 Charles W. Hutchison, Wisconsin legislator
 David William Hutchison, U.S. Air Force Major General
 Mortimer M. Jackson, jurist and diplomat
 William A. Jones, Wisconsin State Representative
 Francis Little, Wisconsin State Senator
 Allen Ludden, host of the game show Password
 James G. Monahan, U.S. Representative
 Abner Nichols, Wisconsin State Representative
 Ernie Ovitz, baseball player
 Jabez Pierce, Wisconsin legislator
 William Thomas Rawleigh, Illinois State Representative
 Theodore Rodolf, Wisconsin State Representative
 William Rudolph Smith, Pennsylvania State Representative and Senator, Attorney General of Wisconsin
 Calvert Spensley, Wisconsin State Representative
 Moses M. Strong, Wisconsin State Assembly Speaker of the House
 John B. Terry, merchant, soldier, pioneer, and Wisconsin territorial legislator
 Cadwallader C. Washburn, U.S. Representative, founder of General Mills
 Alexander Wilson, Attorney General of Wisconsin

Notes

References

External links

 City of Mineral Point official website
 Mineral Point Chamber of Commerce
 Sanborn fire insurance maps: 1884 1889 1894 1900 1908 1915

Cities in Wisconsin
Cities in Iowa County, Wisconsin
1827 establishments in Michigan Territory
Populated places established in 1827
Cornish-American culture in Wisconsin